Malatíny is a village and municipality in Liptovský Mikuláš District in the Žilina Region of northern Slovakia.

History 
In historical records the village was first mentioned in 1250.

Geography 
The municipality lies at an altitude of 580 metres and covers an area of 4.176 km². It has a population of about 150 people.

External links 
 https://web.archive.org/web/20071217080336/http://www.statistics.sk/mosmis/eng/run.html

Villages and municipalities in Liptovský Mikuláš District